Hans D. Baumann is a German-American inventor and engineer. He has registered over 200 patents and produced 105 publications. He is known internationally as a valve specialist and is an expert on aerodynamic noise of gases and he is a frequent contributor to the NEWSMAX Magazine INSIDERS website.

Life
Baumann came to the United States from Germany in 1953, as an exchange student. He holds degrees from [Case Institute of Technology (now part of Case Western Reserve University)]
and Northeastern University, and earned a Ph.D. in Mechanical Engineering from Columbia Pacific University.

Baumann has worked as Chief Engineer at W. & T. Co., a valve supplier in Germany; Manager of Research & Development at Worthington S/A in France; Director of Engineering at Cashco, Inc., in the U.S.; Vice President of Masoneilan International, Inc.; and Senior Vice President of Technology for Fisher Controls.  In 1977, he founded H. D. Baumann Assoc., Ltd., manufacturing control valves; the company was subsequently acquired by Fisher Instruments, and is now part of Emerson Process Management.

Baumann is a licensed Professional Engineer in four states and a member of Sigma Xi, the Scientific Research Society.

Awards
 Honorary Member of the International Society of Automation
 Inductee "Process Automation Hall of Fame"
 Life Fellow Member of the American Society mechanical Engineers.

Publications
 "Top-heavy management drains companies", InTech, May 2008
 "Outsourcing—Good or Evil?", Mechanical Engineering 
 Control Valve Primer: A User's Guide 
 The Ideal Enterprise.
 Hitler's Fate: The Final Story.
 Building Lean Companies: How To Keep Companies Profitable As They Grow
 The Vanished Life of Eva Braun
 Atomic Irony, how German Uranium helped to defeat Japan

Significant scientific publications
 Source: INTERNATIONAL ELECTRICAL COIMMISSION, Geneva, Switzerland. IEC Standards: 60534-2-1, 60534-8-3, 60534-8-4. 
 Baumann, H.D., "A unifying Method for Sizing Throttling Valves Under Laminar or Transitional Flow Conditions", Journal of Fluids Engineering, Vol. 115, No. 1, March 1993, pp. 166–168 
 Baumann, H. D., 'A Method for Predicting Aerodynamic Valve Noise Based on Modified Free Jet Noise Theories," ASME Paper 87-WA/NCA-728, December 1987. 
 Baumann, H. D. and George W. Page Jr. 'A Method to Predict Sound Levels from Hydrodynamic Sources Associated with Flow through Throttling Valves,' Noise Control Engineering Journal, Vol. 43, No. 5, September–October 1995 _pp. 145–158. 
 Baumann, H. 0., "Determination of Peak internal Sound Frequency Generated by Throttling Valves for the Calculation of Pipe Transmission Losses,' Noise Control Engineering Journal, Vol. 36, No. 2, March–April 1991, pp. 75–82.
 Contributing Author of I.I. NOISE AND VIBRATION ENGINEERING,
 Contributing Author to: PROCESS CONTROL AND OPTIMIZATION, ( [v.2])

References

External links
 Criticism of Hitler's fate: "Hitler’s Fate, according to Dr. Hans D. Baumann", Counterknowledge

Year of birth missing (living people)
Living people
American business writers
American inventors
German emigrants to the United States
American technology writers
Case Western Reserve University alumni
Northeastern University alumni
Columbia Pacific University alumni
21st-century American historians
21st-century American male writers
American male non-fiction writers